Graeme Timothy Cunningham (born 25 January 1975 in Goulburn, New South Wales) is a retired Australian cricket player, who played predominantly for the Tasmanian Tigers.

Graeme Cunningham was an effective middle order batsman. More a hard hitting slogger than a stylist, he began his cricketing career with promise, performing well in New South Wales colts and under-age sides. Unable to get into the New South Wales Blues, he tried for the Canberra Comets instead. He played for Canberra until they withdrew from the ING Cup, and then transferred to Tasmania.

Cunningham's big hitting, but lack of application, has seen him selected more frequently in for Tasmania's one days matches rather than Pura Cup games.

See also
 List of Tasmanian representative cricketers

External links 
 Cricinfo profile

1975 births
ACT Comets cricketers
Australian cricketers
Living people
Tasmania cricketers
People from Goulburn
Cricketers from New South Wales